Peter Bolhuis (Born 14 January 1954) is a Dutch actor, with appearances in many films and TV serials.

Selected filmography

Amsterdam Vice (2019)
Whitefish (TV movie) (2009) as Joustra
Where Is Winky's Horse? (2007) as Vader Sofie
De hel van Tanger (2006) as Jack
Winky's Horse (2005) as Vader Sofie
All Souls (2005) as Portier 1
Anne Frank: The Whole Story (TV miniseries) (2001) as Victor Kugler
Quidam, Quidam (1999) as Old Master Duivik
The Boy Who Stopped Talking (1996) as Vader Jeroen
Romeo (1990) as Chiel
Schakels (TV movie) (1983)

References

External links
 

Living people
Dutch male film actors
1954 births
20th-century Dutch male actors